Medina is a city in and the county seat of Medina County, Ohio, United States. The population was 26,094 at the 2020 census. It lies about 33 miles (53 km) south of Cleveland and 23 miles (37 km) west of Akron within the Cleveland metropolitan area.

History

Medina was founded on November 30, 1818, as part of the Connecticut Western Reserve. It was originally named Mecca, but an unincorporated community in Ohio already had that name, so the name was changed. Both Mecca and Medina are Saudi Arabian cities particularly significant in Islam.

Most early residents were farmers. In the 1830s, the community's growth was aided by the completion of the Ohio and Erie Canal, which helped transport agricultural products to markets. On January 31, 1835, Medina was incorporated as a village and as the county seat of Medina County. By 1855, the town's quarries were producing over $200,000 worth of stone per year. In 1857, many of the canal workers started a strike for higher wages; the striking workers were fired, and the four workers who started it were jailed in Albion, Ohio.

In 1835, two enslaved women and two Native Americans arrived in Medina by stagecoach. One of the enslaved women was the child of then-Vice Presidential candidate Richard Mentor Johnson and Julia Chinn. The next day, Johnson's nephew arrived, in pursuit of the women, saying that he owned them both, they had escaped, and they had stolen a $1,000 bank check. The women were arrested and charged with stealing. Three local attorneys volunteered to represent them in court. The women were then released to Johnson's nephew to stand trial in Kentucky. Afterward, one of the Native Americans said that the women had asked for help escaping enslavement and their terrible treatment by their owners. It was later found that the alleged theft was a lie in order to make sure the Ohio court returned them to their owners.

Medina attorney Charles Olcott invented self-ballasting iron ships, and received a patent in 1835. Olcott was originally from Connecticut and had been a student at Yale College when he came up with the early prototypes for his invention. He was later a proponent of building long-distance railroad lines across Ohio.

In 1869, Amos Root founded the A.I. Root Company in Medina as a manufacturer of beehives and beekeeping equipment, and the town became a center for beehive manufacturing. The Root Company had 97 workers in 1886, making it the town's largest employer.

In the mid-1800s, two disastrous fires hit the village. One, in 1848, destroyed the entire business district. With no facilities for extinguishing fires, the residents attempted to put out the fire using a bucket brigade, but to no avail, as the fire burned for four hours. None of the town's 1,159 residents died in the fire, but the townspeople failed to budget for the needed firefighting equipment. In 1870, another large fire, which started in a wooden building with a barbershop, destroyed 45 buildings (all but two blocks of the business district) and nearly wiped out the town. Despite the second calamitous fire, the town still had not organized a fire department beyond a bucket brigade. In 1877, after repeated dire warnings, the Council finally authorized the issuance of $3,000 worth of bonds to purchase a fire engine.

After the disastrous 1870 fire, the town literally rose from the ashes. Much of the Medina Square, including the Town Hall and Engine House, was rebuilt under the supervision of onetime mayor and banker Harrison Gray Blake, who owned the Phoenix Building in the same city block. Buildings like the H. G. Blake's Phoenix Block and the Town Hall and Engine House indicate the community's resilient spirit.

After the 1870 fire, it took almost ten years to replace the buildings on the Square, hence their common Victorian style. Even today, the architectural unity and historic flavor of the Town Square make Medina an appealing destination for residents, visitors and tourists. This character is what makes the Square a recognized Historic District and spurs the efforts of the Community Design Committee and the Historic Preservation Board to preserve the city's historic look and feel.

Today, Medina's Historic District is a nine-block area surrounding Uptown Park and hosts Candlelight Walk, the International Festival, and Art in the Park. It also draws visitors for many other events.

In 1950, Medina had over 5,000 residents, and on May 6, 1952, it was chartered as a city.

Geography
Medina is located at  (41.135899, -81.864069). and includes parts of Lafayette Township, Medina Township, Montville Township and York Township in Medina County.

Demographics

2020 census
As of the recent census of 2020, there were 26,094 people, 10,755 households, and 7,531 families residing in the city. The population density was 2,174.50 people per square mile (839.575 people per square km). The racial makeup of the city was 88.3% White, 3.5% African American, 0.2% Native American, 0.9% Asian, 1.3% from other races, and 5.8% from two or more races. Hispanic or Latino of any race were 3.3% of the population.

2010 census
At the 2010 census, there were 26,678 people, 10,382 households, and 6,991 families residing in the city. The population density was 2,260.85 people per square mile (872.973 people per square km). The racial makeup of the city was 93.3% White, 3.1% African American, 0.1% Native American, 0.9% Asian, 0.5% from other races, and 2.1% from two or more races. Hispanic or Latino of any race were 1.8% of the population.

There were 10,382 households, of which 38.0% had children under the age of 18 living with them, 51.7% were married couples living together, 12.0% had a female householder with no husband present, 3.6% had a male householder with no wife present, and 32.7% were non-families. 27.8% of all households were made up of individuals, and 11% had someone living alone who was 65 years of age or older. The average household size was 2.53 and the average family size was 3.13.

The median age in the city was 36.4. 28.3% of residents were under 18; 7.3% were between 18 and 24; 27.4% were from 25 to 44; 25.2% were from 45 to 64; and 11.7% were 65 or older. The gender makeup of the city was 48.1% male and 51.9% female.

Of the city's population over age 25, 34.4% held a bachelor's degree or higher.

2000 census
At the 2000 census, there were 25,139 people, 9,467 households and 6,683 families in the city. The population density was 2,215.7 people per square mile (855.14 people per square kilometer). The racial makeup of the city was 94.60% White, 2.77% African American, 0.19% Native American, 0.74% Asian, 0.03% Pacific Islander, 0.26% from other races, and 1.41% from two or more races. Hispanic or Latino of any race were 1.00% of the population.

There were 9,467 households, of which 40.3% had children under age 18 living with them, 35.5% were married couples living together, 57.6% had a female householder with no husband present, and 29.4% were non-families. 25.1% of all households were made up of individuals, and 9.5% had someone living alone who was 65 or older. The average household size was 2.60 and the average family size was 3.15.

29.9% of the population were under 18, 7.2% from 18 to 24, 33.8% from 25 to 44, 18.8% from 45 to 64, and 10.2% were 65 or older. The median age was 33. For every 100 females, there were 92.1 males. For every 100 females 18 and over, there were 89.2 males.

The median household income was $50,226 and the median family income was $57,435. Males had a median income of $42,437 compared with $26,893 for females. The per capita income was $21,709. About 5.1% of families and 5.7% of the population were below the poverty line, including 7.1% of those under 18 and 6.2% of those 65 or over.

Economy
Due to Medina's location, about 33 miles (53 km) south of Cleveland and 23 miles (37 km) west of Akron, many of its residents work in the Cleveland and Akron areas. Medina's median household income is $53,586, slightly above the Ohio median income.

RPM International is among the companies based in Medina.

Education

The Medina City School District serves the city. It has one high school, two middle schools, one alternative school (for students with behavioral problems), one preschool (for children aged 3–5 with disabilities) and seven elementary schools. The newest elementary schools are Eliza Northrop and Ralph E. Waite elementary schools, both opened for the 2009–10 school year. The schools in the Medina City School District are:

 A.I. Root Middle School
 Claggett Middle School
 Eliza Northrop Elementary School
 Ella Canavan Elementary School
 Evolve Academy (alternative school for students with behavioral problems)
 Garfield Elementary School
 H.G. Blake Elementary School
 Helping Hands Preschool (preschool for children aged 3–5 with disabilities)
 Heritage Elementary School
 Medina High School
 Ralph E. Waite Elementary School
 Sidney Fenn Elementary School

The Medina County Career Center serves most of Medina County (except Wadsworth) to provide career education for 11th and 12th graders. It also offers adult and continuing education for adults. Other schools in Medina include St. Francis Xavier School, a Roman Catholic parochial school serving pre-kindergarten through 8th grade, and Medina Christian Academy, a non-denominational Protestant parochial school serving pre-K through 12th grade. The Medina County University Center is a quarter-mile south of the city and offers employers a well-trained workforce with opportunity for ongoing career development. Medina also is home to the Walton School of Auctioneering.

The Medina County District Library Main Library is in Medina.

Media
Medina is served by a daily newspaper, The Medina County Gazette  which is published every day of the week except Sundays, and a free weekly newspaper, The Medina Post, published every Saturday. In addition, the Akron Beacon Journal and the Cleveland Plain Dealer occasionally cover the city and Medina County. Medina is served by numerous television and radio stations from both the Greater Cleveland, Greater Akron and Greater Canton areas.

Transportation
Medina is served by the Medina Municipal Airport, which is 4.6 miles (7.41 km) east of the city. US-42 traverses the city. State routes include OH-3, OH-18 and OH-57. Medina is also served by the Medina Transit Authority, which runs buses around Medina and Medina County.

Rail service reached Medina in the 1800s, and at one time it was served by three rail lines, the Baltimore & Ohio, the Akron, Canton & Youngstown, and the Cleveland Southwestern interurban. Today the Wheeling & Lake Erie Railroad maintains numerous sidings and spurs serving many industries, mostly on the city's west side. Many other rights of way have been converted to hiking and biking trails.

Notable people
Drew Allar, quarterback for the Penn State Nittany Lions
Matt Amodio, game show contestant known for winning over $1,500,000 on Jeopardy!
William G. Batchelder, former judge and former Speaker of the Ohio House of Representatives
Ryan Dunn, actor, stuntman (Jackass)
Scott Fahlman, computer scientist and credited creator of the emoticon
Wayne Gift, NFL quarterback
Kyle Juszczyk, NFL fullback
Daryl Morey, NBA basketball executive
L.L. Nunn, founder of Telluride House, Telluride Association, and Deep Springs College
Matthew Patrick, founder and host of the YouTube channel The Game Theorists & GTLive
Greg Paulus, head coach Niagara Purple Eagles, basketball player for Duke University, football quarterback for Syracuse University
Bobby Rahal, auto racing team owner and former driver
Amos Root, noted for innovations in beekeeping
Jon Teske, NBA basketball player
Donna VanLiere, author of the Christmas Shoes series of books and other publications
Ricky Wysocki, professional disc golfer

References

External links

City website

 
Cities in Ohio
Cities in Medina County, Ohio
County seats in Ohio
Populated places established in 1816
Cleveland metropolitan area
1816 establishments in Ohio